Jyotiraditya Madhavrao Scindia (born 1 January 1971)  is an Indian politician who serves as the Minister of Civil Aviation,Government of India in the Second Modi Ministry since 2021.This position his father,Madhavrao Scindia from 1991 to 1993. He also heads the Ministry of Steel,Government of India in the second Modi Ministry since 2022. He is a Member of Parliament in the Rajya Sabha representing the State of Madhya Pradesh since 2020. He is a former Member of Parliament in the Lok Sabha, representing the Guna constituency in Madhya Pradesh from 2002 until his defeat in the 2019 Indian general election. He is former member of the Indian National Congress (INC) from 2001 to 2020 and presently a member of the Bharatiya Janata Party (BJP) since 2020. While a member of the INC,he served as the Minister of State (Independent Charge) for Power and Corporate in the Second Manmohan Singh Ministry from 2012 to 2014.

Scindia is the son of the late Indian politician, Madhavrao Scindia, and a grandson of Jivajirao Scindia, the last ruler of the princely state of Gwalior during the British Raj in India. Jyotiraditya was briefly the titular Crown Prince of Gwalior in 1971, until the privy purses and titles of Indian royals were abolished by the government in 1971.

Early life and education
Scindia was born on 1 January 1971 in Mumbai to Madhavrao Scindia and Madhavi Raje Scindia. He originally belongs to Kurmi caste.

He was educated at Campion School, Mumbai and at The Doon School, Dehradun.

Scindia was admitted to St. Stephen's College, Delhi, University of Delhi. He later transferred to Harvard College, the undergraduate liberal arts college of Harvard University, where he graduated with BA degree in Economics in 1993. In 2001, he received a Master of Business Administration from the Stanford Graduate School of Business.

Scindia is a grandson of Jivajirao Scindia, the last Maharaja of the princely state of Gwalior.  His father Madhavrao Scindia was an Indian politician and a minister in the government of Rajiv Gandhi. Scindia's mother is Madhavi Raje Scindia (Kiran Rajya Lakshmi Devi). He is married to Priyadarshini Raje Scindia.

Political career

Indian National Congress

On 30 September 2001, the Guna constituency fell vacant due to the death of Scindia's father, the sitting MP Madhavrao Scindia, in an airplane crash in Uttar Pradesh. On 18 December, he formally joined the INC and pledged to uphold the "secular, liberal and social justice values" of his father.

On 24 February, Scindia won the by-election in Guna, defeating his nearest rival, Desh Raj Singh Yadav of the BJP, by a margin of approximately 450,000 votes. He was re-elected in May 2004, and was introduced to the Union Council of Ministers in 2007 as Minister of State for Communications and Information Technology. He was then re-elected in 2009 for a third consecutive term and became Minister of State for Commerce and Industry.

Scindia was appointed Minister of State for Communication in 2007 later as minister of state independent charge for Power in a cabinet reshuffle which drafted a number of younger politicians into the Indian cabinet, including two other scions of princely families, R. P. N. Singh and Jitendra Singh.

In 2010, he filed a legal claim to be the sole inheritor of the property belonging to his late father worth , however this was challenged in court by his aunts.

Scindia was tasked by the Indian Planning Commission with preventing a repetition of the July 2012 India blackout, the largest power outage in history, which affected over 620 million people (about 9% of the world population). In May 2013, Scindia claimed that checks and balances had been put in place to prevent any recurrence of grid collapse and that India would have the world's largest integrated grid by January 2014.

In 2014, Scindia was elected from Guna but lost his seat to Krishna Pal Singh Yadav. In 2019, he was appointed as General Secretary in-charge for Uttar Pradesh West along with Priyanka Gandhi Vadra.

Bharatiya Janata Party
The Congress party then released a statement claiming that he had been expelled for "anti-party activities." He joined the BJP on 11 March 2020. Other MLAs loyal to him also resigned from the INC and their MLA posts. This led to the 2020 Madhya Pradesh political crisis which in turn resulted in the resignation of Kamal Nath as Chief Minister on 23 March 2020. Nath's replacement, Shivraj Singh Chouhan, was sworn in as Chief Minister of Madhya Pradesh on 23 March 2020.

On 19 June 2020, Scindia was elected a BJP Rajya Sabha MP from Madhya Pradesh. On 7 July 2021, Scindia was appointed as the Minister of Civil Aviation in Second Modi ministry after a cabinet reshuffle in July 2021.

In February 2022, Scindia was appointed PM Modi's special envoy to Romania to oversee the evacuation of Indian nationals in Ukraine resulting from during the 2022 Russian invasion of Ukraine. As a part of Operation Ganga, he is overseeing the evacuation efforts of students and Indian professionals through Bucharest and Suceava.

Other roles

Scindia is chairman of the regional Madhya Pradesh Cricket Association (MPCA). After the spot fixing scandal in the Indian Premier League was made apparent and Sanjay Jagdale, a member of the MPCA, resigned from his post as secretary in the Board of Control for Cricket in India, Scindia spoke out against corruption in Indian cricket.

Scindia is President of the Board of Governors of Scindia School, which was founded by his great-grandfather, Madho Rao Scindia, in 1897.

He is also a hereditary patron of Daly College, which was established in 1870 to educate the children of the royalty, nobility, and aristocracy of Central Indian princely states of the Marathas, Rajputs, Mohameddans & Bundelas.

Scindia is chairman of Madhav Institute of Technology and Science.

See also
Jai Vilas Mahal

References

|-

|-

|-

|-

External links

 Members of Fourteenth Lok Sabha - Parliament of India website

1971 births
Living people
Indian Hindus
The Doon School alumni
Scindia dynasty of Gwalior
Madhya Pradesh politicians
Indian National Congress politicians from Madhya Pradesh
Delhi University alumni
Harvard College alumni
Harvard University alumni
Stanford Graduate School of Business alumni
Stanford University alumni
India MPs 2004–2009
India MPs 2009–2014
Rajya Sabha members from Madhya Pradesh
Bharatiya Janata Party politicians from Madhya Pradesh
India MPs 1999–2004
Lok Sabha members from Madhya Pradesh
India MPs 2014–2019
Union ministers of state of India with independent charge
Ministers of Power of India
Narendra Modi ministry